Ivy Kirksey (December 18, 1902 – death date unknown) was an American Negro league catcher in the 1920s.

A native of Hobson City, Alabama, Kirksey played for the Dayton Marcos in 1926. In 28 recorded games, he posted 13 hits in 80 plate appearances.

References

External links
 and Seamheads

1902 births
Year of death missing
Place of death missing
Dayton Marcos players
Baseball catchers
Baseball players from Alabama
People from Calhoun County, Alabama